Joe A. Rector (August 12, 1935 – August 19, 2012) was born in Muskogee, Oklahoma.  He is a part of the Cherokee ancestry. He lived in Muskogee and Tulsa, Oklahoma for most of his life, until he retired. Afterwards, he moved to Destin, Florida, to live near his children until the time of his death in 2012.

Rector started to draw when he was about 5, and he would later become an artist after finding his passion for art.

His first drawings were done by looking at comic book characters and drawing them.  As a teenage artist, he began to study all forms and styles of artwork on his own.  Everything from commercial art and signs to fine art of various types, western art being his favorite.

Having a great interest in physical fitness, Rector became a champion weightlifter, setting several state records, two national and one world record.  He developed an appreciation for great strength and body development. Incorporating this appreciation  into his artwork combined with his deep spirituality has produced portrayals of the American Indian and other Western characters that show great strength of the active, robust early American.

A Rector "character" painting gives the impression of strength and power but still has the grace and beauty of lines that were portrayed by some of the "Old Masters" such as Michelangelo.

Rector is listed on the State of Oklahoma's website as one of their "Famous Oklahomans". Rector was also recognized as one of the top "Movers And Shakers" in the book written by Victoria Lee celebrating Tulsa, Oklahoma's centennial.

References

People from Muskogee, Oklahoma
American male weightlifters
Painters from Oklahoma
Native American painters
1935 births
2012 deaths